Sympistis kappa is a species of moth in the family Noctuidae (the owlet moths). It is found in North America.

The MONA or Hodges number for Sympistis kappa is 10066.2.

References

Further reading

External links

 

kappa
Articles created by Qbugbot
Moths described in 1874